Everything Sucks! is an American comedy-drama streaming television series created by Ben York Jones and Michael Mohan that parodies teen culture of the mid-1990s. Ten half-hour episodes were ordered by Netflix and the series was released on February 16, 2018. The series is set in the real-life town of Boring, Oregon in 1996, and focuses on a group of teenagers who attend the fictional Boring High School as they proceed to make a movie together while dealing with issues such as finding their sexualities, mental health, and growing up.

On April 6, 2018, it was announced that Netflix had cancelled the series after one season.

Plot 
Everything Sucks! revolves around students at Boring High School in Oregon in 1996; centering around the A/V Club, and the Drama Club, with both groups seen as misfits. Luke O'Neil is a freshman at Boring, along with his best friends, McQuaid, a pessimistic geek, and Tyler Bowen, a squeaky-voiced, immature teen. Immediately, the boys are seen as social outcasts and join the A/V Club, where Luke develops a crush on Kate Messner, the principal's daughter and a sophomore at Boring. Kate, however, starts questioning her sexuality and develops a crush on drama student Emaline Addario, who is dating fellow drama student Oliver Schermerhorn. However, Kate starts dating Luke after rumors of her being gay are spread around the school.

When an accidental destruction of the sets, inadvertently caused by Kate, causes the play to be cancelled, Luke and his friends suggest the A/V Club and Drama Club make a movie together, which would then be screened to the whole high school. Meanwhile, Luke deals with discovering VHS tapes that his father made before leaving him and his mother years prior. Throughout the season, Luke's mother, Sherry, begins to grow close to Ken Messner, Kate's father and the principal of Boring, and Kate is struggling with her identity and sexuality, Tyler struggles with his friends' interest in girls, and McQuaid develops a crush on Emaline, only to be rejected.

Cast

Main cast
 Jahi Di'Allo Winston as Luke O'Neil, a freshman in A/V club who has a crush on Kate Messner. His father, Leroy, abandoned him and his mother when he was a child. 
 Peyton Kennedy as Kate Messner, the daughter of the principal and a sophomore in A/V club. She starts questioning her sexuality and develops a crush on Emaline Addario.
 Patch Darragh as Ken Messner, the principal and Kate's dad who starts to connect with Sherry, Luke's mother. His wife, Kate's mother, died when Kate was five.
 Claudine Mboligikpelani Nako as Sherry O'Neil, Luke's mother and a flight attendant who starts to become romantically close to Ken
 Quinn Liebling as Tyler Bowen, a freshman in A/V club and one of Luke's best friends. He has ADHD and dyslexia.
 Elijah Stevenson as Oliver Schermerhorn, a senior in drama club and Emaline's boyfriend, who eventually runs away to New York
Sydney Sweeney as Emaline Addario, a junior in drama club and Oliver's ex-girlfriend with a flair for drama
Rio Mangini as McQuaid, a freshman in A/V club, one of Luke's best friends

Recurring cast
 Abi Brittle as Leslie, a religious member of A/V club, who is friends with Kate and later develops a crush on Tyler
 Jalon Howard as Cedric, a member of the drama club
 Connor Muhl as Scott Pocket, a pervy student who reads the morning announcements with Jessica
 Nicole McCullough as Jessica Betts, a perfectionist who reads the morning announcements with Scott
 Ben York Jones as Mr. Stargrove, the quirky A/V club teacher

Guest stars 
 Zachary Ray Sherman as Leroy O'Neil, Luke's father who left when he was 7 years old
Jen Taylor as Miss Stock, a teacher of Boring High School

Episodes

Production
Filming for the series took place in Oregon in the towns of Boring, Oregon City, Portland and at Fort Rock State Natural Area near Bend in summer 2017. The crew managed to film in a real Blockbuster in Sandy which eventually closed after they finished shooting.

Reception 

Everything Sucks! received positive reviews from critics. Rotten Tomatoes gave the first season an approval rating of 72% based on 47 reviews, and an average rating of 6.1/10. The site's critical consensus states, "A flawed series that ticks off all the nostalgia boxes, Everything Sucks! still manages to tug at the heartstrings." Metacritic gave the first season a weighted average score of 62 out of 100 based on reviews from 19 critics, indicating "generally favorable reviews". The series is frequently compared to Stranger Things, Freaks and Geeks, as well as Degrassi.

Everything Sucks!, although well received, was criticized for its over-the-top use of tropes, sometimes unrealistic situations, as well as not developing its supporting characters. However, the coming out storyline and the performances of the ensemble cast, particularly Winston and Kennedy, received much praise. Emine Saner from The Guardian wrote that the creators "took the idea of nostalgia and teenhood so far they just ended up repeating tropes", however praised Kate's storyline as well as Winston and Kennedy's performances. On the other hand, Jen Chaney of Vulture gave Everything Sucks! a positive review, praising its "treatment of its young characters", and once again, praised Kennedy and Winston's performances. However, she did criticize some dialogue choices, some of the music, and the under developed supporting characters. Caroline Framke of Vox said, that it "takes too long to figure out its twist on a typical coming-of-age romance. But once it gets there, it’s great" and gave particular praise to Kate's storyline.

References

External links
 

2010s American comedy-drama television series
2010s American high school television series
2010s American LGBT-related comedy television series
2010s American LGBT-related drama television series
2010s American romantic comedy television series
2010s American teen drama television series
2010s romantic drama television series
2018 American television series debuts
2018 American television series endings
American romantic drama television series
English-language Netflix original programming
Television series about teenagers
Television series set in 1996
Television shows filmed in Oregon
Television shows set in Oregon
Coming-of-age television shows
Bisexuality-related television series